Giandomenico De Marchis (24 October 1893 – 13 July 1967) was an Italian sculptor. His work was part of the sculpture event in the art competition at the 1936 Summer Olympics.

References

1893 births
1967 deaths
20th-century Italian sculptors
20th-century Italian male artists
Italian male sculptors
Olympic competitors in art competitions
People from the Province of Alessandria